Kenar Rud (also Romanized as Kenār Rūd) is a village in Sakht Sar Rural District, in the Central District of Ramsar County, Mazandaran Province, Iran. At the 2006 census, its population was 17, in 8 families.

References 

Populated places in Ramsar County